Renton v. Playtime Theatres, Inc., 475 U.S. 41 (1986), was a case in which the Supreme Court of the United States held that localities may impose regulations prohibiting adult theaters from operating within certain areas, finding that the regulation in question was a content-neutral time/place/manner restriction. The specific restriction at issue was established by Renton, Washington and prohibited adult theaters within 1,000 feet from any residential zone, single- or multiple-family dwelling, church, park, or school.

See also

List of United States Supreme Court cases, volume 475

References

External links

1986 in United States case law
United States Supreme Court cases
United States Supreme Court cases of the Burger Court
United States Free Speech Clause case law
United States pornography law
Renton, Washington
United States land use case law